"Gone" is a single recorded by  Korean-New Zealand singer Rosé, for her debut single album R, which was released on 12 March 2021 by YG Entertainment. The song was written by J. Lauryn, Teddy Park, Rosé and Brian Lee, and was produced by Lee and 24. Rosé performed the full version of "Gone" for the first time on SBS's Inkigayo on 14 March. “Gone” is a soft rock, alternative rock and indie rock romantic ballad about lamenting past love and future loneliness.

The song was released as the second single from R, on 4 April 2021, alongside the release of its music video. Directed by Kwon Yong-soo, the video shows the South Korean singer mourning the loss of a relationship in an elaborately decorated old house. "Gone" peaked at number six in South Korea and one in Malaysia and debuted in the top 100 of several countries, including Australia, Canada, Hungary, and New Zealand. Although it did not enter the US Billboard Hot 100, it debuted at number fifteen on the Digital Songs Sales chart.

Background and release
On 30 December 2020, in an interview with South Korean media outlet Osen, Rosé revealed that filming for her debut music video would begin in mid-January 2021. On 25 January 2021, a 33-second teaser titled "Coming Soon" was uploaded to Blackpink's official YouTube channel and featured Rosé singing an snippet of an unknown track. Later that day, it was announced that Rosé will be showcasing a portion of the unknown track, later revealed to be titled "Gone", at Blackpink's first virtual concert, The Show, on 31 January 2021. On 11 March, Rosé revealed in an online press conference that "Gone" was originally recorded two years earlier. The following day, the song was officially released as the second track off the single album, R. A month later, on 5 April 2021, it was officially released as a single, alongside its music video.

Composition and reception
"Gone" was written by Brian Lee, J. Lauryn, Teddy Park, Rosé and produced by 24 and Brian Lee. "Gone" is a soft rock, alternative rock and indie rock romantic ballad underlaid with an electric guitar. Pertaining to a mellow vibe, the production of the song features a "stripped-back" sound and built around strummed guitar chords. The lyrics to "Gone" describe a female protagonist who still has feelings for her former lover, who has moved on. The singer's vocals were described as "raw" and  "direct". In terms of musical notation, the song is composed in the key of F# major, with a tempo of 80 beats per minute, and runs for three minutes and twenty-seven seconds.

"Gone" received positive reviews from music critics; with many noting the use of English lyrics. Writing for Beats Per Minute, JT Early described the song as a "moody, guitar-driven break-up track." Rhian Daly off NME stated that "on paper, [the song] sounds boring and uninspired but, with Rosé’s vocals on top of the real thing, it becomes a diamond in the rough." Justin Curto of Vulture described the song as a "stripped-back ballad." Following the performance at Blackpink's virtual concert, Teen Vogue wrote that "Gone" has "an indie-rock sensibility, with beachy electric guitars." Jeff Benjamin off Billboard described the track as "an emotional, acoustic-leaning cut, revealing vulnerable lyrics." A journalist for the Korean Broadcasting System, a South Korean television and radio company, felt that "Gone" perfectly reveals the theme of a departed love.

Music video

Background
On 27 March 2021, the singer confirmed during an Instagram Live broadcast that the video for "Gone" would be released "very, very soon". On 31 March, Rosé announced via her social media accounts that the music video would be released in five days. On April 4, the second teaser poster was released. The music video for "Gone" reached 10 million views on YouTube in half a day after its release. It garnered 15 million views in its first 24 hours, marking the fourth biggest 24-hour debut for a Korean female soloist. The behind the scenes video was uploaded on 7 April. On  July 5, the music video surpassed 100 million views on YouTube.

Synopsis

The music video shows the singer on an emotional roller coaster while looking back on a past romance. It opens with Rosé wrapped in a furry green jacket while waking up on a candlelit bathroom floor, slowly opening her eyes next to a bathtub. Next, Rosé is happily smelling roses, playing chess with her lover and twirling around with a handheld camera in an elaborately decorated old house. The scenes change from the singer acting happy and carefree to lying sadly and realising that her relationship is over. Meanwhile, vivid splashes of spilled wine and dripping candle wax foreshadow the red rose's inevitable end. Rosé then appears sitting alone at a nighttime bus stop, wearing a little black dress and a pair of white platform boots. The singer is then shown in a rainbow-colored dress while sitting on a couch. Then the music video shows Rosé in front of a projector, angrily throwing ripped pillows in a dark room, throwing out old picture frames and standing amid a blazing fire, while the house's furniture is covered in tarp. In the final scene, the singer is in a denim jacket and mutlicolored camisole dress, dining alone with a glass of red wine in the kitchen.

Commercial performance
"Gone" debuted and peaked at number 29 on the Global 200 with 19.6 million streams and 25,000 sold worldwide, and at number 17 on the Global Excl. U.S. with 17.4 million streams and 19,000 sold outside the U.S. The song charted on the Global 200 for a total of three weeks. In South Korea, the song debuted at number 49 on the Gaon Digital Chart for the chart issue date 7–13 March 2021, before ascending to its peak of number six the following week. It also debuted at number five on the Billboard K-pop Hot 100. In the United States, the song debuted at number 15 on the Billboard Digital Song Sales chart. It charted in Oceania as well, peaking at number 63 in Australia and 6 in New Zealand. "Gone" also debuted at number one in Malaysia and number two in Singapore.

Live performances
On 31 January 2021 the singer performed "Gone" at Blackpink's first virtual concert, The Show. On 14 March 2021, Rosé made the debut performance of "On the Ground" and "Gone" on SBS' Inkigayo. Throughout March, the singer continued to perform the song on M Countdown, Show! Music Core, and Inkigayo.

Accolades

Credits and personnel

 Roseanne Park – lead vocals, writer
 Brian Lee – producer, writer
 J. Lauryn – writer
 Teddy Park – writer
 24 – producer
 Josh Gudwin – mixing
 Randy Merrill – mastering
 Yongin Choi – recording

Charts

Weekly charts

Monthly charts

Year-end charts

Release history

See also 
 List of K-pop songs on the Billboard charts
 List of number-one songs of 2021 (Malaysia)

Notes

References

2021 songs
Rosé (singer) songs
Songs written by Teddy Park
2021 singles
Number-one singles in Malaysia
English-language South Korean songs
Interscope Records singles
YG Entertainment singles
Songs written by Brian Lee (songwriter)
Pop ballads